Arotrophora khasiasana is a species of moth of the family Tortricidae. It is found in India, where it has been recorded from the Khasi Hills.

The wingspan is about 15 mm. The ground colour of forewings is yellowish cream, strigulated (finely streaked) and reticulated (a net-like pattern) with brown. The costa is suffused with brownish and the tornal and terminal areas are suffused with brownish grey. The hindwings are creamish grey, but more cream at the costa where brownish reticulation is found.

Etymology
The species name refers to Khasi Hills, the type locality.

References

Moths described in 2009
Arotrophora
Moths of Asia